James is a fictional anthropomorphic red tender locomotive from The Railway Series children's books by the Reverend Awdry and the TV series adaptation Thomas & Friends. He is a mixed-traffic engine, which means he is just as capable of hauling coaches and trucks. He has a 2-6-0 ("Mogul") wheel arrangement and is engine number 5 on the North Western Railway, The Fat Controller's railway on the Island of Sodor.

James first appeared in The Railway Series in 1946, in the book Thomas the Tank Engine. Two books in the series, no. 3 James the Red Engine and no. 28 James and the Diesel Engines, are dedicated to James.

Prototype and Behind the scenes

James first appeared in The Railway Series  in the 1946 book Thomas the Tank Engine. He was named after James Furze, a friend of the publisher's son. He was originally painted black. At the request of the publishers, Awdry dedicated James the Red Engine to the character. James was painted red in this and subsequent books. 

James is based on the L&YR Class 28, an  mixed-traffic tender engine designed by George Hughes and based on the earlier L&YR Class 27 designed by John Aspinall. According to Awdry, the Class 28s were powerful engines but had a tendency to be nose-heavy, especially when used as relief engines on excursion trains and driven at speed. In the book The Island of Sodor: Its People, History and Railways, Awdry gave a fictional history of the engine. James was built by Hughes as an experiment to see if the nose-heaviness could be counteracted. (The real Class 28 has  wheels.) James is also missing the prominent front sandboxes fitted to the Class 28s. The improvement was not as great as hoped for and after the grouping, the LMS sold James to the Fat Controller's North Western Railway.

James as a model
Awdry had two models of James on his OO gauge model railway. The first, from the 1950s, was based on a 2-6-0 Glasgow and South Western Railway locomotive, the Austrian Goods, designed by Peter Drummond, which is the very same engine that Awdry had originally envisioned James as but changed it due to unknown reasons. Awdry's model was painted red with yellow lining. Despite being professionally made and "a beautiful model", the motor was so unreliable that the loco could not be used for regular services. Awdry later noted that it was sent away in the 1980s for a new motor and chassis and came back "completely transformed".

Awdry's second model of James was based on a 1960s Tri-ang Johnson 3F 0-6-0; a conversion which Hornby themselves would use for the production version of their model of James, several decades later.

James in The Railway Series
James the Red Engine was the third book in the Railway Series by Reverend W. Awdry. It picked up where the previous book, Thomas The Tank Engine, left off, as James was introduced in "Thomas & The Breakdown Train" where the Troublesome Trucks pushed him into a field after his wooden brake blocks caught fire.

James and the Top Hat
The Fat Controller has given James a new coat of red paint, to cheer him up after the accident on his first day, and becomes rather conceited. He lets off steam and accidentally sprays water on the Fat Controller's new top hat. He hurries Edward and the coaches away in panic and initially pulls too far from their first stop station platform. After meeting Thomas again, he focuses enough to move their train over Gordon's Hill, and he and Edward laugh about its comical name origin, which unfortunately leads to James' laughter becoming hiccups, frightening an elderly passenger. After an eventful day, James is content with his success, yet worried about the Fat Controller's response.

James and the Bootlace
The next day, the Fat Controller (still cross over his hat’s dampening) threatens to repaint James blue if he continues to cause trouble. An upset James is impatient and rough with the coaches, to where their resistance brings a leak in the brake pipe, which his driver, fireman, and conductor mend with newspaper and a passenger's bootlace, after coercing the only passenger with a bootlace to reluctantly hand it over. Once the hole has been mended, James miserably resolves not to bump coaches as he awaits the outcome.

Troublesome Trucks
After the incident with the coaches, James has been confined to the shed for several days. The Fat Controller lets James out and assigns him a goods train.  The trucks try to make him give up when they come to Gordon's Hill, but James keeps on. Eventually, a rusty coupling snaps, and some trucks roll downhill. The conductor stops them and Edward the Blue Engine offers to help, but James prefers to go it alone instead. The trucks seem to realize James will keep trying whatever they do, and finally allow James to reach the top of the hill. After hearing about what happened, the Fat Controller deems James worthy of his red coat.

James and the Express
Gordon the Big Engine boasts to James that he is the only engine who is able to pull the Express. James is resting in the shed the next day when Gordon arrives feeling mournful (he has accidentally been switched to the loop line and had a long, wasted journey). James teases him about it, but a horde of angry passengers arrives and demands refunds. Instead, James pulls the Express and does so well that the Fat Controller allows him to take the Express when Gordon needs a rest. James and Gordon are now the best of friends. Gordon never mentions bootlaces, and the two engines bond over their dislike of trucks.

James in Thomas & Friends (the television series) 
Unlike the books, the TV episode "Thomas and the Breakdown Train" had a red-coloured James from the beginning (most likely done for cost reasons). For unknown reasons, James has also appeared in all episodes before "Thomas and the Breakdown Train" even though this story established him as being a new engine.

Like in the books, James is very proud of his red paintwork and does not like getting dirty. This can often get him into trouble.

James appears in every Thomas movie (one of only four characters to do so, the others being Thomas, Henry, and Gordon), but only has major roles in four of them.

He appears as one of the leads of the 2013 movie King of the Railway, in which he, Thomas, and Percy assist in the restoration of Ulfstead Castle and the construction of the Earl of Sodor’s estate.

James appears as the main antagonist of the 2014 film Tale of the Brave. Here, he pulls a prank on Percy which leads the latter to think there is a monster on the island. They make amends after Percy saves James from a rockslide at the quarry.

In the film The Adventure Begins, which retells the first seven episodes of the show, James appears in his original black livery. In this version, James arrived on Sodor before Thomas and is the engine Annie and Clarabel originally belonged to, unlike in the books and the original TV adaptation. In the book and the original episode, James crashes out of sight offscreen which prompts Thomas to get the breakdown train. In this version, Thomas instead chases after the runaway James to try and stop him, but this ultimately fails and James crashes into a field. Thomas then gets the breakdown train, has James put back on the tracks, and takes him to the Steamworks. James comes back some time later, now painted in his familiar red, but finds his twin coaches have been designated Thomas' for his new branch line's use.

In the 2017 movie Journey Beyond Sodor, After Henry is injured and prevented from taking a freight train to the mainland, James is assigned the transport. However, as James has been teasing Thomas for always being stuck on his branch line, Thomas takes the train instead to spite him. When Thomas goes missing, James volunteers to go look for him in hopes of being praised as a hero. After some investigation, he uncovers Frankie and Hurricane's deception on Thomas' whereabouts. However, he is imprisoned in a large steelworks that Thomas had escaped from earlier and is forced to work there. He is eventually rescued by Thomas and a group of misfit experimental engines.

James in Thomas and the Magic Railroad
In the 2000 film, Thomas and the Magic Railroad, James was threatened by Diesel 10 and almost got pushed back into a smelting pit before being teleported out by Mr. Conductor Jr. (portrayed by Michael E. Rodgers). In the beginning, the fly annoying James was a reference to the original Awdry story "Buzz, Buzz".

Susan Roman voiced James in the film. Michael Angelis provided James's voice in the workprint, along with Percy.

James in All Engines Go
In the 2021 reboot, James was brought back as a regular character. However, unlike the original series, he was brought down as a main cast member, now appearing as a supporting character. Much like many of the other characters in the reboot, many of James' design elements and personality were altered to a more engaging dynamic towards the young engines. He does exhibit carelessness with his (often) dropped cargo.

Voice actors

English
 Susan Roman (Thomas and the Magic Railroad)
 Michael Angelis (Thomas and the Magic Railroad, original work-prints only)
 Keith Wickham (UK, Hero of the Rails – Series 20)
 Kerry Shale (US, Hero of the Rails – Series 18)
 Rob Rackstraw (US, The Adventure Begins – Series 24, UK; "Tit for Tat" – Series 24)
 Luke Marty (US, Thomas & Friends: All Engines Go)

Others
 Katsuji Mori (Japan, Series 1 – Series 8)
 Masashi Ebara (Japan, Calling All Engines! onwards)
 Um Sang-hyun (Korea, Series 18 – Series 19)

James in the Guinness Book of Records
A large-scale working replica of James (along with Thomas, Percy, Gordon, Harold and Jack) was created by BBC Visual Effects (UK) for Thomas & Friends: The All Aboard Live Tour. This battery-powered locomotive is listed in the Guinness Book of Records as the largest model railway engine ever built, at 2.64 x 1.5 x 6.52 metres.

"Real life" James
The Mid-Hants Railway repainted one of its engines – a Southern Railway N Class – into the livery of James. The engine retained this colour scheme for many years and participated in The Railway Series golden jubilee celebrations at the National Railway Museum. This engine was the only replica Thomas character to be certified to run on the mainline.  On the East Lancashire Railway, unrestored LMS Ivatt Class 2 Mogul No. 46428 has been painted as James the Red Engine.

References

The Railway Series characters
Thomas & Friends characters
Fictional locomotives
Literary characters introduced in 1946
2-6-0 locomotives